Pamela Joan Willetts FSA (9 April 1929 - 25 January 2019) was an English musicologist and the deputy keeper of manuscripts at the British Museum. She produced the first catalogue since 1816 of the manuscripts in the Society of Antiquaries of London, an organisation of which she was a fellow.

Selected publications
 "The Dohnányi Collection", The British Museum Quarterly, Vol. 25, No. 1/2 (Mar. 1962), pp. 3–11. 
 "A reconstructed astronomical manuscript from Christ Church Library, Canterbury" in The British Museum Quarterly, 20.1965, 1/2, pp. 22–30.
 "Musical Connections of Thomas Myriell", Music and Letters, Vol. XLIX, No. 1 (Jan. 1968), pp. 36–42. https://doi.org/10.1093/ml/XLIX.1.36
 The Henry Lawes Manuscript. British Museum, London, 1969.
 "Autographs of Angelo Notari", Music and Letters, Vol. L, No. 1 (Jan. 1969), pp. 124–126. https://doi.org/10.1093/ml/L.1.124
 Beethoven and England: An Account of Sources in the British Museum. British Museum, London, 1970.
 "The seven-branched candlestick as a Psalter illustration", Journal of the Warburg and Courtauld Institutes, Vol. 42. (1979), pp. 213–215.
 Catalogue of the Manuscripts in the Society of Antiquaries of London. D.S. Brewer, 2000.

References

External links 
 https://www.worldcat.org/identities/lccn-nr95005461/

1929 births
2019 deaths
People associated with the British Museum
Fellows of the Society of Antiquaries of London
English musicologists
People from Kingston upon Thames
People educated at Tiffin School
Alumni of Newnham College, Cambridge